The Tributaries of Redbank Creek drain parts of Jefferson, Clarion, and Armstrong counties, Pennsylvania. The following table lists all the named tributaries of Redbank Creek (Pennsylvania), a tributary of the Allegheny River. For each stream, the name, tributary number, coordinate and political subdivision of the confluence, and coordinate of the source are given.

Direct tributaries

North Fork Creek
North Fork Creek

Sandy Lick Creek
Sandy Lick Creek

Little Sandy Creek

See also
List of tributaries of the Allegheny River

References

 
Counties of Appalachia
Rivers of Pennsylvania
Tributaries of the Allegheny River
Wild and Scenic Rivers of the United States
Allegheny Plateau
Rivers of Armstrong County, Pennsylvania
Rivers of Clarion County, Pennsylvania
Rivers of Jefferson County, Pennsylvania